The Atlanta WCT was a men's tennis tournament played in Atlanta, Georgia from 1970–1976.  The event was part of the WCT Tour. It was played on outdoor hard courts in 1970,  and on indoor carpet courts at the Alexander Memorial Coliseum in 1973–76. This tournament is not to be confused with the WCT Atlanta, a WCT tournament played in the 1980s.

Past finals

Singles

Doubles

See also
 Atlanta Open - men's tournament (since 2010)
 WTA Atlanta – women's tournament (1975–1983)

References

External links
 ATP World Tour archive

Defunct tennis tournaments in the United States
World Championship Tennis
Sports competitions in Atlanta
1970 establishments in Georgia (U.S. state)
1976 disestablishments in Georgia (U.S. state)
Recurring sporting events established in 1970
Recurring sporting events disestablished in 1976